Jesús Ángel Rojo Pinilla (born February 4, 1974, in Madrid, Spain) is a Spanish entrepreneur, lawyer, historian, political analyst, writer and journalist.

Biography 
In 1999 founded the newspaper The District, which later became the leading newspaper of Madrid local information. His long business career and vocation for journalism drove him to create and lead the Communication Group The District, and an audio-visual company. 
Pinilla is the director of the radio program "Madrid al Rojo", and candidate for general director of radio TV Madrid (TELEMADRID).

His passion for history led him to travel across America and Europe, writing and publishing books on local history. Pinilla is a regular speaker on political and historical issues, and is also a regular contributor to several media communications as an analyst of current policy.

Publications
District 10 years 2012
When we were invincible. Best-seller 2015
The Invincibles of America 2016
Great traitors to Spain 2017

Awards and decorations
Military and Hospital Order of St. Lazarus of Jerusalem. 
Academician of the Academy of Diplomacy of the Spain's Kingdom.
Knight Hispanic Imperial Order of Carlos V.
Award Communication Group Trough category "Best Communicator"

References
 
 
 
 
 
 
 
 
 
 
 

1974 births
Spanish businesspeople
Living people
20th-century Spanish lawyers